was a town located in Kitamatsuura District, Nagasaki Prefecture, Japan.

As of 2003, the town had an estimated population of 2,763 and a density of 161.39 persons per km2. The total area was 17.12 km2.

On January 1, 2006, Takashima, along with the town of Fukushima (also from Kitamatsuura District), was merged into the expanded city of Matsuura.

Technically an island, Takashima is linked to mainland Kyūshū by a bridge.

Dissolved municipalities of Nagasaki Prefecture